John Bredice (June 23, 1934 – October 1, 1997) was an American football end. He played for the Philadelphia Eagles in 1956.

References

1934 births
1997 deaths
Sportspeople from Waterbury, Connecticut
Players of American football from Connecticut
American football ends
Boston University Terriers football players
Philadelphia Eagles players